Tibor Gáspár (born 2 September 1957) is a Hungarian actor. He appeared in more than sixty films since 1978. His brother Sándor Gáspár is also an actor.

Selected filmography

References

External links 

1957 births
Living people
Hungarian male film actors